Mitogen-activated protein kinase kinase kinase kinase 1 is a protein kinase that in humans is encoded by the MAP4K1 gene. It is also known as HPK1 (Hematopoietic Progenitor Kinase 1). The protein has been shown to play a role in JNK activation.

Interactions 

MAP4K1 has been shown to interact with:

 B-cell linker, 
 CRK, 
 CRKL, 
 Drebrin-like, 
 GRAP2,
 Grb2, 
 Linker of activated T cells,  and
 NCK1.

References